was a Japanese daimyō of the early Edo period who ruled the Shimomura, Minakuchi, and Mibu Domains.
In 1841, after Takashima Shūhan first modern Western military demonstration in Tokumarugahara, Torii Tadateru was one of the high rank nobles who criticised him, this ending with Takashima placed under investigation and house arrest on charges of subversion and conspiracy <Tolstoguzov, Sergey. "The International Situation in East Asia and the Establishment of a Modern Army and Modern Warfare in Japan: The Memorandum of Takashima Shūhan " Asiatische Studien - Études Asiatiques, vol. 72, no. 1, 2018, pp. 249-268. https://doi.org/10.1515/asia-2017-0078>. 

|-

|-

|-

References
 Japanese Wiki article on Tadateru (15 Sept. 2007)

1665 births
1716 deaths
Daimyo